The 2008 Delaware Republican presidential primary was held on February 5 (Super Tuesday). A total of 18 delegates were selected. McCain was followed by Mitt Romney in second and then by Mike Huckabee in third.

Candidates

 Mike Huckabee
 John McCain
 Ron Paul
 Mitt Romney

Candidates Rudy Giuliani, Duncan Hunter, Fred Thompson, and Tom Tancredo had dropped out of the presidential race before the Delaware primary.

Results

*Candidate withdrew before primary

Analysis

McCain was the expected favorite in the 2008 primary among the Republican candidates; his campaign was led by Delaware's only House representative, Rep. Michael N. Castle.

In Delaware, 27,412 of the 102, 455 registered Republicans voted in the election, resulting in a 26.76 percent turn-out rate.

Winners of Previous Primaries 

 2000: George W. Bush
 1996: Steve Forbes

See also

 2004 Delaware Democratic presidential primary
 2008 Republican Party presidential primaries

References

External links

State of Delaware, Commissioner of Elections

Delaware
Republican presidential primaries
2008 Super Tuesday
2008